, is a Japanese  manga series written by George Abe and illustrated by Masasumi Kakizaki. Episodes are called "Crimes". The anime's opening theme is "We're Not Alone" by Coldrain and the ending theme is "A Far-Off Distance" by Galneryus, both signed to VAP.

Episode list

References

Rainbow: Nisha Rokubō no Shichinin